Indium(III) oxide (In2O3) is a chemical compound, an amphoteric oxide of indium.

Physical properties

Crystal structure
Amorphous indium oxide is insoluble in water but soluble in acids, whereas crystalline indium oxide is insoluble in both water and acids. The crystalline form exists in two phases, the cubic (bixbyite type) and rhombohedral (corundum type). Both phases have a band gap of about 3 eV. The parameters of the cubic phase are listed in the infobox. 

The rhombohedral phase is produced at high temperatures and pressures or when using non-equilibrium growth methods. It has a space group Rc No. 167, Pearson symbol hR30, a = 0.5487 nm, b = 0.5487 nm, c = 1.4510 nm, Z = 6 and calculated density 7.31 g/cm3.

Conductivity and magnetism
Thin films of chromium-doped indium oxide (In2−xCrxO3) are a magnetic semiconductor displaying high-temperature ferromagnetism, single-phase crystal structure, and semiconductor behavior with high concentration of charge carriers. It has possible applications in spintronics as a material for spin injectors.

Thin polycrystalline films of indium oxide doped with Zn2+ are highly conductive (conductivity ~105 S/m) and even superconductive at liquid helium temperatures. The superconducting transition temperature Tc depends on the doping and film structure and is below 3.3 K.

Synthesis
Bulk samples can be prepared by heating indium(III) hydroxide or the nitrate, carbonate or sulfate. 
Thin films of indium oxide can be prepared by sputtering of indium targets in an argon/oxygen atmosphere. They can be used as diffusion barriers ("barrier metals") in semiconductors, e.g. to inhibit diffusion between aluminium and silicon.

Monocrystalline nanowires can be synthesized from indium oxide by laser ablation, allowing precise diameter control down to 10 nm. Field effect transistors were fabricated from those. Indium oxide nanowires can serve as sensitive and specific redox protein sensors. The sol–gel method is another way to prepare nanowires.

Indium oxide can serve as a semiconductor material, forming heterojunctions with p-InP, n-GaAs, n-Si, and other materials. A layer of indium oxide on a silicon substrate can be deposited from an indium trichloride solution, a method useful for manufacture of solar cells.

Reactions
When heated to 700 °C, indium(III) oxide forms In2O, (called indium(I) oxide or indium suboxide), at 2000 °C it decomposes.
It is soluble in acids but not in alkali.
With ammonia at high temperature indium nitride is formed 
 In2O3 + 2 NH3 → 2 InN + 3 H2O
With K2O and indium metal the compound K5InO4 containing tetrahedral  InO45− ions was prepared.
Reacting with a range of metal trioxides produces perovskites for example:
In2O3 + Cr2O3 → 2 InCrO3

Applications
Indium oxide is used in some types of batteries, thin film infrared reflectors transparent for visible light (hot mirrors), some optical coatings, and some antistatic coatings. In combination with tin dioxide, indium oxide forms indium tin oxide (also called tin doped indium oxide or ITO), a material used for transparent conductive coatings.

In semiconductors, indium oxide can be used as an n-type semiconductor used as a resistive element in integrated circuits.

In histology, indium oxide is used as a part of some stain formulations.

See also
Indium
Indium tin oxide
Magnetic semiconductor

References

Indium compounds
Semiconductor materials
Sesquioxides